Kimmy Vivienne Repond (born 18 October 2006) is a Swiss figure skater. She is the 2023 European bronze medalist, the 2022 CS Budapest Trophy silver medalist, the 2022 CS Ice Challenge bronze medalist and the 2023 Swiss national silver medalist.

Repond finished seventh at the 2022 World Junior Championships and is a two-time (2020, 2022) Swiss junior national champion.

Personal life 
Repond was born on 18 October 2006 in Basel, Switzerland, to father René, a management consultant, and mother Claudia, a lawyer. She has three sisters – Sidonie, Jérômie, and Caline – all of whom have competed in figure skating. In addition to skating, Repond is also an amateur model. She plans to pursue a career in medicine once she retires from competitive skating.

Career

2021–22 season: International junior debut 
Repond made her international and ISU Junior Grand Prix debut at the 2021 JGP Slovakia in September, coached by her older sister Jérômie. She finished eighth in both segments to place eighth overall and did not receive a second assignment. She competed at three more international junior B events in the fall, taking the title at both the 2021 Trophée Métropole Nice and the 2021 NRW Trophy, and placing second at the 2021 Santa Claus Cup behind Nina Pinzarrone of Belgium.

Repond claimed her second Swiss junior national title in late January 2022 by a 27-point margin over second-place finisher Sarina Joos and was later assigned to the Swiss women's berth at the 2022 World Junior Championships. At Junior Worlds, held in Tallinn, Estonia, in April, Repond placed eighth in the short program and seventh in the free skate to finish seventh overall. She was the highest-finishing European junior woman in the event.

2022–23 season: International senior debut and European bronze 
Repond opened her season in early September at the 2022 JGP Austria, where she placed fourth in the short program. She dropped to sixth in the free skate to finish sixth overall. At her second JGP assignment, the 2022 JGP Poland I, one of two events held in Gdańsk, Repond placed seventh in the short program. However, with a clean skate and a new personal best in the free program, she climbed in the standings to fourth place in the segment and fourth overall, her best finish at a JGP event to date.

In October, Repond competed at her first senior international event, the 2022 CS Budapest Trophy. She won the short program with a new personal best score but fell to third place in the free skate to ultimately finish second overall between American gold medalist Ava Marie Ziegler and Estonian bronze medalist Niina Petrõkina. Notably, Repond led domestic rival Alexia Paganini by over six points after the short program, but Paganini later withdrew before the free.

Repond competed at a second Challenger Series assignment, the 2022 CS Ice Challenge held in Graz, Austria in November. Doctors discovered a partial fracture in her foot days before the competition but she still decided to skate to qualify for the European Championships. She placed ninth in the short program after falling on a planned triple Lutz but rose to second in the free skate to place third overall behind Italian Anna Pezzetta and Canada's Kaiya Ruiter. After the competition, she took a 3-week break to let her foot heal. Due to this, she missed two international competitions. 

Repond competed at her first senior Swiss Figure Skating Championships in mid-December. With reigning national champion Alexia Paganini absent, Repond was heavily favored to win the title. However, she got back on the ice just two weeks before nationals and placed third in the short program and first in the free skate to narrowly finish in second place behind Livia Kaiser.  Repond was later named to the Swiss team for the 2023 European Championships alongside Kaiser.

At the European Championships, held in Espoo in late January, Repond placed third in the short program despite a quarter call on her triple Lutz jump, behind Georgian segment leader Anastasiia Gubanova and pre-event favourite Loena Hendrickx of Belgium. She noted that having "been dreaming about going" to the European championships, she had "tried not to have any expectations," which mean that "third place is a really big thing for me, and I am really happy." She was second in the free skate after Hendrickx fell twice, remaining third overall by a margin of only 0.97 points and winning the bronze medal. Her placement marked the first podium finish for a Swiss women's singles skater at the European Championships since Sarah Meier won the title in 2011.

Repond was next assigned to the 2023 World Junior Championships in Calgary, where she aimed to finish in the top eight and thereby qualify a Swiss berth at the 2024 Winter Youth Olympics. Tenth in the short program with underrotation calls on her jumps, she rallied in the free skate and rose to seventh overall.

Programs

Competitive highlights 
CS: Challenger Series; JGP: Junior Grand Prix.

Detailed results 
ISU personal bests highlighted in bold.

Senior level

Junior level

References

External links 
 

2006 births
Living people
Sportspeople from Basel-Stadt
Swiss female single skaters
Swiss children
21st-century Swiss women